St. Clements is a rural municipality in Manitoba, Canada. It is located to the north-east of Winnipeg, stretching from East St. Paul and Birds Hill Provincial Park in the south to Lake Winnipeg and Grand Beach Provincial Park to the north. The Red River demarcates the western boundary of the municipality. St. Clements contains the communities of East Selkirk, and Lockport east of the Red River. It almost completely surrounds the Brokenhead 4 Indian reserve, with the exception of a small lakefront on Lake Winnipeg.

Its population at the 2016 census was 10,876. The city of Selkirk borders it to the west, across the Red River of the North.

Communities
Communities located within St. Clements include:
 Beaconia
 East Selkirk
 Grand Marais
 Libau
 Lockport (part)
 Scanterbury
 Thalberg

Demographics 

References

External links
Rural Municipality of St. Clements website
Red River North Heritage Discover the rich heritage of one of the oldest settled areas of Manitoba, Canada.
Map of St. Clements R.M. at Statcan
Community Profile: St. Clements Rural Municipality, Manitoba; Statistics Canada
 Manitoba Historical Society - Manitoba Municipalities
 Historic Sites of Manitoba: Balsam Bay Cemetery (RM of St. Clements)
 Historic Sites of Manitoba: St. Lukes Anglican Church (RM of St. Clements)

St._Clements
St._Clements